The 2014 Australian Carrera Cup Championship was a CAMS sanctioned Australian motor racing title open to Porsche 911 GT3 Cup cars. Porsche Cars Australia Pty Ltd was appointed as the Category Manager for the championship, which was the tenth Australian Carrera Cup Championship.

The championship was won by Steven Richards.

Teams and drivers

The following teams and drivers contested the 2014 Australian Carrera Cup Championship.

Note: All teams competed with the Porsche 911 GT3 Cup Type 991, which was the only model eligible for the championship.

Race calendar
The championship was contested over an eight round series.

Points system
Championship points were awarded to the first 25 finishers in each race as per the following table.

In addition to contesting the outright championship, each driver was classified as either Professional or Elite and competed for the relevant class title.

Points were awarded for class places in each race on the same basis as for the outright championship.

The results for each round were determined by the number of championship points scored by each driver at that round.

The driver gaining the highest points total over all rounds was declared the winner of the championship.

Race 2 at the Sandown round was abandoned following a multi-car accident and no championship points were awarded.

Championship standings

Overall

Professional Class

Elite Class

References

External links

 

Australian Carrera Cup Championship seasons
Carrera Cup Championship